Van Helmont is a Dutch and Flemish surname.  It may refer to:

 Jan van Helmont (1650 – between 1714 and 1734), a Flemish painter
 Jan Baptist van Helmont (1580 - 1644), a Flemish chemist, physiologist, and physician
 Franciscus Mercurius van Helmont (1614 - 1699) a Flemish alchemist and writer, the son of Jan Baptist van Helmont
 Mattheus van Helmont (1623 - after 1685), a Flemish painter
 Zeger Jacob van Helmont (1683 -  1726), a Flemish painter